Beachy is a surname of Amish origin. Notable people with the surname include:

Brandon Beachy, Atlanta Braves baseball player
Israel Beachy, bassist in Christian rock band
Moses M. Beachy, the founding bishop of the Beachy Amish Mennonite churches in 1927
Philip A. Beachy, professor of molecular biology
Robert M. Beachy, historian
Roger N. Beachy, molecular biologist
Stephen Beachy, writer

See also
Lincoln Beachey, aviator
Beechy, a village Saskatchewan, Canada